Forgan Public Schools is located in the small town of Forgan, Oklahoma. It contains a single K-12 school for all students. The school mascot is the bulldog.

Forgan High School has won the 2011 and 2012 Class B boys' basketball state championships.

References

External links

School districts in Oklahoma
Education in Beaver County, Oklahoma